Mycenae Schoolhouse is a historic one-room school building located in the hamlet of Mycenae in the town of Manlius in Onondaga County, New York.  It is a one-story building built of locally quarried limestone with a low-pitched gabled roof in the Greek Revival style. The roof features a small belfry. It was built in 1850 and ceased being used as a school in 1936.

It is prominently located on NY 5.

It was listed on the National Register of Historic Places in 1983.  In recent years it has been used as an antiques shop.  As of late 2009, the building is vacant and available for sale or for rent.

References

School buildings on the National Register of Historic Places in New York (state)
School buildings completed in 1850
One-room schoolhouses in New York (state)
Schoolhouses in the United States
Buildings and structures in Onondaga County, New York
Manlius, New York
National Register of Historic Places in Onondaga County, New York